The Dominican Summer Marlins are a minor league baseball team in the Dominican Summer League. The team plays in the Boca Chica North division and is affiliated with the Miami Marlins.

Roster

External links
DSL Marlins on SABR Minor Leagues Database

Dominican Summer League teams
Miami Marlins minor league affiliates
Baseball teams in the Dominican Republic